Fort Oglethorpe, Georgia was a military facility in the US state of Georgia, in Catoosa County. After it was deactivated in 1947, its facilities formed the basis for the present town of Fort Oglethorpe, Georgia.

During and after World War I, facilities at this fort were used to detain some 4,000 enemy military personnel as prisoners of war and civilian detainees, from 1917 through 1920.

Camp description
"The War Prison Camp of Fort Oglethorpe consisted of a huge, somewhat hilly plot of land approximately a mile square. The entire area was surrounded by two barbed-wire fences, about ten feet high." Tripod watch towers were located outside the barbed wire perimeter. Each tower was equipped with a search light, telephone and machine-gun.

The camp was divided into two component parts. Camp A, the "millionaire's camp," housed wealthy prisoners in private rooms who paid for their own food, and also retained cooks and servants recruited from the stewards and sailors of the German maritime fleet. Camp B consisted of some thirty barracks which housed the majority of the 4,000 prisoners. It was dominated by an immense mess-hall.

Prisoners, military and civilian
The military prisoners included crews from the German raiders SS Prinz Eitel Friedrich,  and the British-origin/German-seized steamship . The civilian internees included businessmen denounced by their American commercial rivals, and individuals of German, Czech, Polish and other nationalities charged with a variety of offenses under the Espionage Act of 1917.

Prominent prisoners included Count Albrecht von Montgelas, Dr. Karl Muck, conductor of the Boston Symphony Orchestra, Dr. Ernst Kunwald, conductor of the Cincinnati Symphony Orchestra, Professor Richard Benedict Goldschmidt, biologist Dr. Isaac Strauss, and Professor Zenneck. Dr. Karl Muck was falsely accused of having refused a request to perform "The Star-Spangled Banner" in an October 1917 concert. Theodore Roosevelt and other US citizens were furious with him. Despite having been unaware of the request at the time and always ending future concerts with the national anthem, Muck was still arrested and interned. Dr. Kunwald was arrested as being an "enemy alien" citizen of Austria. He was held at Fort Oglethorpe for a year before being deported to his home country. This deportation was on condition of his being set free. Professor Goldschmidt was arrested due to his German citizenship; he was not released until after the war. Dr. Isaac Strauss was a German spy who was arrested at the beginning of the war. He was allegedly part of a German Jewish spy organization. Professor Zenneck was arrested for allegedly being a German radio spy. His activities made him extremely feared by the US government.

Prisoners were separated by several categories. First were those openly or suspected to be supportive of German views. These prisoners were arrested for spying, sabotage, or making pro-German statements. Another group were "Prisoners of War," or sailors and merchants in the US when World War I began. Lastly were the group nicknamed "trouble-makers." These included radicals and members of Industrial Workers of the World (I.W.W.). Often these different groups tended to clash due to loyalty questions. This tended to be particularly true between "Prisoners of War" and loyal supporters of the war. This led to the need to separate camps. The culturally elite were primarily housed at Fort Oglethorpe, while the rest were separated among other prisons.

The culturally elite prisoners at Fort Oglethorpe had benefits above the other prisoners. Because of their wealth, they could pay for better housing in another compound. They were not required to perform labor and could hire other prisoners to do it for them.

Daily life and activities
Daily life was strictly regulated. The bugle sounded at 5:30 AM, roll call took place at 6:30, followed by breakfast. The bugle sounded again at twelve noon for mess while the period from 1PM to 3PM was declared a rest period. Another roll call followed at 5:30 and after dinner the prisoners were free to pursue their own activities.

Other activities also took place. Moving pictures were provided twice weekly. Education possibilities were available. Remedial instruction was available to the non-wealthy prisoners. The courses of the camp "University" included lectures in Spanish, Portuguese, Russian, Chinese, Arabic, Hebrew, Malay as well as courses in biology (Professor Goldschmidt), physiology (Dr. Isaac Strauss), electronics (Professor Zenneck) and art (Count Montgelas). Musical events were a prominent part of camp life. On one memorable occasion, Dr. Karl Muck conducted a performance of Beethoven's Eroica symphony. ("Dr. Muck had sworn he would never conduct again in America, but we convinced him that Fort Oglethorpe was really Germany, and so he gave in"). Other activities included chess, pinochle, football, handball, reading, carpentry,  walking, and writing letters and cards to family members, members of Congress and the Department of Justice. Prisoners were allowed to print their own newspaper. However, it was often used to slip in comments about the prison. One article wrote "Secondary to the influenza more or less than 50 people died- unofficially. All here greater than a short time are more or less crazy-officially." Prisoners were also allowed to grow vegetables in the prison garden and use them in their food. Non-canned food from family and friends and foods from the Prison Exchange could also be used.

Illnesses, deaths and escapes
The illnesses included tuberculosis, instances of insanity, and influenza. Tuberculosis patients were isolated in a tent and put on what was described as an unpalatable diet. The cases of insanity in a population of 4,000 included "dozens and dozens of men" who were transferred to St. Elizabeth's Asylum for the Insane in Washington. The postwar influenza pandemic was "perhaps the most ghastly of them all; day and night ambulances rushed through the camp; day and night patient after patient was transported to the hospital....More than half of the inmates became ill." The total number of dead is not provided. The usual escape attempts took place but, as in most such cases, most of the escapees were recaptured. It appears that the one successful escape artist was one "Henckel" who made several unsuccessful attempts but at last succeeded, "and thus probably the only real spy the United States had interned at Oglethorpe disappeared for good."

Legal aspects of imprisonment
The Swiss Embassy represented the German interests and the Swedish Embassy represented those of the Austro-Hungarian Empire. Some of the prisoners performed hard labor on the roads and in the quarry. They were ordered to sign a document that they were doing so of their own free will. Many refused to sign and were locked in a separate camp behind barbed wire. Protests to the Swiss Consul, Dr. Huebscher, were ineffectual; but the Swedish Count Rosen, who represented the Austro-Hungarian prisoners, was able to reverse the decision, "and the prisoners were returned to the main camp and put back on full rations." Otherwise, the treatment of the prisoners was generally fair ("not that we were badly treated") but the prisoners suffered from two major irritants. Letters and cards were heavily censored, and, following the Armistice of November 11, 1918, the prisoners suffered "from the unbearable uncertainty as to the duration of our detention." 2,000 German prisoners and 1,600 civilian internees who agreed to be deported were returned to Germany and the former Austria-Hungarian Empire in June and July 1919.

The remaining prisoners who wished to stay in the United States, perhaps 400 or so, then began a letter writing campaign. "We wrote to the Senators and Congressmen representing the sections of the country we came from. We wrote to all of them, collectively and individually. We wrote to judges, lawyers and hundreds of times to the Department of Justice. Never once did we receive an answer from a Congressman. The Swedish and Swiss Legations stopped answering our letters. The Department of Justice invariably replied that it regretted exceedingly not to be able to release us 'in the immediate future.' How we came to loathe that phrase."

Erich Posselt was interviewed by a representative of the Justice Department who accused him of having been a passenger on various British vessels, including HMS Hampshire, on which Lord Kitchener died, and thereby aiding and abetting the sinking of Allied ships by German submarines, charges that Posselt characterized as idiotic. Posselt was finally released on parole on January 12, 1920.

Internees
 Richard Goldschmidt
 Ernst Kunwald
 Karl Muck

Notes

Sources
 Erich Posselt, "Prisoner of War No. 3598 [Fort Oglethorpe],"  American Mercury, v. 11, no. 43 (July 1927) 313-323.

Internment camps in the United States
Internment of German Americans
Military installations in Georgia (U.S. state)
Prisoner of war camps in the United States
United States war crimes
World War I crimes by the United States
World War I internment camps
World War I prisoner-of-war camps
World War I sites in the United States